Top 100 España is a record chart published weekly by PROMUSICAE (Productores de Música de España), a non-profit organization composed of Spanish and multinational record companies. This association tracks both physical sales (including CDs and vinyl) and digital (digital download and streaming) record consumption in Spain.

Since the chart dated July 2, 2020 (week 27), the  sales list and the streaming list were merged into one chart.

Albums

Best selling albums in Spain in 2020

References

2020 in Spanish music
Spain Albums
Spanish record charts
Impact of the COVID-19 pandemic on the music industry